Saša Varga (born 19 February 1993) is a professional footballer who plays as a forward for Austrian club FCM Traiskirchen.

Career
Varga started out at Rad, making his Serbian SuperLiga debut in 2011. He later played for Slovenian clubs Brda and Radomlje. In January 2020, Varga returned to Serbia and signed with Javor Ivanjica.

Personal life
Born in Liège, Belgium, Varga is the son of fellow footballer Zvonko Varga.

References

External links
 
 
 
 

1993 births
Living people
Footballers from Liège
Belgian footballers
Serbian footballers
Serbian expatriate footballers
Association football forwards
Expatriate footballers in Spain
Expatriate footballers in Slovenia
Expatriate footballers in Austria
FK Rad players
FK Palić players
FK BASK players
FK Teleoptik players
FC Jumilla players
FK Bežanija players
FK Sinđelić Beograd players
NK Brda players
NK Radomlje players
FK Javor Ivanjica players
Serbian expatriate sportspeople in Spain
Serbian expatriate sportspeople in Slovenia
Serbian expatriate sportspeople in Austria
Serbian SuperLiga players
Serbian First League players
Segunda División B players
Slovenian Second League players
Slovenian PrvaLiga players
Belgian people of Serbian descent
Belgian expatriate footballers
Belgian expatriate sportspeople in Spain
Belgian expatriate sportspeople in Slovenia
Belgian expatriate sportspeople in Austria